The LSWR Class S11 was a class of 10 4-4-0 steam locomotives designed for express passenger work by Dugald Drummond.  They were introduced to services on the London and South Western Railway in 1903.  None of the class survived into preservation after their brief career in British Railways ownership.

Background 

The problem of uniting both power and traction in a compact express passenger locomotive design had taxed the Locomotive Superintendents of the LSWR for many years. Joseph Beattie was the first to establish the LSWR's policy of using smaller wheeled locomotives to handle these steep gradients.

Dugald Drummond attempted to grasp the nettle by utilising his new T9 class over the arduous route.  It soon became clear that despite the merits of the T9s for fast running on the various express passenger services to the west of England, the large wheels of the class were not suited for the task in hand.  A new design of locomotive was needed that incorporated the desired improvements to enable fast running on gradients.

Construction history 

Drummond took the decision to construct a new class of ten 4-4-0s especially for this part of the LSWR network.  The class was to incorporate the same frames as the T9, though smaller  driving wheels were substituted, whilst they also had balanced crank axles.  The boiler was also of  diameter, another feature that was different from the T9s, capped off with a dome and stovepipe chimney.  Production began at Nine Elms in 1903, and had ended by the end of the year with a total of ten locomotives.  All locomotives were fitted with the Drummond "watercart" eight-wheel tender for longer running on the LSWR network.

The locomotive was fitted with cross-water tubes fitted into the firebox, as featured on the T9 class, although feedwater tubes were not fitted.   This was an attempt to increase the heat surface area of the water, which was achieved, though at a cost in boiler complexity.  All ten were superheated between 1920 and 1922 by Robert Urie after took over from Drummond.

Livery and numbering

LSWR and Southern

Under the LSWR, the class was outshopped in the LSWR Passenger Sage Green livery with purple-brown edging, creating panels of green. This was further lined in white and black with 'LSWR' in gilt on the tender tank sides.

When transferred to Southern Railway ownership after 1923, the locomotives were outshopped in Richard Maunsell's darker version of the LSWR livery.  The LSWR standard gilt lettering was changed to yellow with 'Southern' on the water tank sides.  The locomotives also featured black and white lining.

However, despite Bulleid's experimentation with Malachite Green livery on express passenger locomotive, the Maunsell livery was continued with the S11s, though the 'Southern' lettering on the tender was changed to the 'Sunshine Yellow' style.  During the Second World War, members of the class outshopped form overhaul were turned out in wartime black, and some of the class retained this livery to Nationalisation.

Post-1948 (nationalisation)

Livery after Nationalisation was initially Southern Wartime Black livery with 'British Railways' on the tender, and an 'S' prefix on the number, until superseded by the Standard BR 30xxx series.

Operational details 

The S11s were regarded as good locomotives on expresses around the ports served by the LSWR.  The class was at first rostered to the West Country in order to ply their trade upon the gradients they were designed for.  However, it was soon realised that the smaller wheels and larger boilers were not living up to expectations of successful operation on the route.  The class was slower and more cumbersome than their siblings. This led to crews displaying their preference for the T9's higher speeds downhill and on the level stretches of railway.

Another aspect that did not endear the class to crewmen on this route was the fact that with a larger boiler, the S11s were heavier on water, which was a vital consideration on a railway with no water troughs to replenish the supply, and therefore skilled use of the injectors was required. The boiler was mounted higher above the frames, which led to instability concerning the ride of the locomotives at high speeds. As a result, more care had to be taken by crewmen in approaching junctions and speed restrictions. Due to their early withdrawal period, none were preserved for posterity.

References

  

4-4-0 locomotives
S11
Railway locomotives introduced in 1903
Scrapped locomotives
Standard gauge steam locomotives of Great Britain